Dr. Kristine Karlson (born November 16, 1963) is an American former rower. She competed in the women's quadruple sculls event at the 1992 Summer Olympics.

After graduating from the University of Connecticut School of Medicine, Karlson earned her doctorate. Although her medical studies had caused her to miss national races, she still competed in the 1989 World Rowing Championships and won gold. As a sports and family physician, she has worked at Dartmouth College, FISA events, and the USA national team.

References

External links
 

1963 births
Living people
American female rowers
Olympic rowers of the United States
Rowers at the 1992 Summer Olympics
University of Connecticut alumni
Rowers from Detroit
21st-century American women
World Rowing Championships medalists for the United States